The Hunter 356 is an American sailboat, that was designed by Glenn Henderson and introduced in 2000.

The design forms a scaled series with the Hunter 306 and the 326. The Hunter 356 design was developed into the 2008 Hunter 36-2.

Production
The design was built by Hunter Marine in the United States, starting in 2000, with 500 boats completed, but it is now out of production.

Design

The Hunter 356 is a recreational keelboat, built predominantly of fiberglass. It has a fractional sloop B&R rig, an internally-mounted spade-type rudder, a reverse transom, mast-furling mainsail and a fixed fin keel. It displaces  and carries  of ballast.

The optional shoal draft keel model has a draft of 

The boat has a PHRF racing average handicap of 141 with a high of 150 and low of 135.

See also
List of sailing boat types

Related development
Hunter 306
Hunter 326

Similar sailboats
C&C 34/36
C&C 35
Express 35
Freedom 35
Hughes 36
Hughes-Columbia 36
Hunter 35 Legend
Hunter 35.5 Legend
Island Packet 35
Landfall 35
Mirage 35

References

External links

Official sales brochure

Keelboats
2000s sailboat type designs
Sailing yachts 
Sailboat types built by Hunter Marine
Sailboat type designs by Glenn Henderson